The 1998 All-Ireland Minor Hurling Championship was the 68th staging of the All-Ireland Minor Hurling Championship since its establishment by the Gaelic Athletic Association in 1928. The championship began on 22 April 1998 and ended on 13 September 1998.

Clare entered the championship as the defending champions, however, they were beaten by Cork in the Munster final.

On 13 September 1998, Cork won the championship following a 2-15 to 1-09 defeat of Kilkenny in the All-Ireland final. This was their 17th All-Ireland title overall and their first title since 1995.

Wexford's Leon O'Connell was the championship's top scorer with 3-37.

Results

Leinster Minor Hurling Championship

First round

Semi-finals

Finals

Munster Minor Hurling Championship

First round

Semi-finals

Final

Ulster Minor Hurling Championship

Semi-final

Final

All-Ireland Minor Hurling Championship

Quarter-finals

Semi-finals

Final

Championship statistics

Top scorers

Top scorers overall

Top scorers in a single game

References

External links
 All-Ireland Minor Hurling Championship: Roll Of Honour

Minor
All-Ireland Minor Hurling Championship